The 2016–17 Oklahoma Sooners women's basketball team will represent the University of Oklahoma in the 2016–17 NCAA Division I women's basketball season. The Sooners are led by Sherri Coale in her twenty-first season. The team will play its home games at the Lloyd Noble Center in Norman, Oklahoma as a member of the Big 12 Conference. They finished the season 23–10, 13–5 in Big 12 play to finish in third place. They lost in the quarterfinals of the Big 12 women's tournament to West Virginia. They received at-large bid of the NCAA women's tournament where they defeated Gonzaga in the first round before losing to Washington in the second round.

Roster

Schedule

|-
!colspan=9 style="background:#960018; color:#FFFDD0;"| Exhibition

|-
!colspan=9 style="background:#960018; color:#FFFDD0;"| Non-conference regular season

|-
! colspan=9 style="background:#960018; color:#FFFDD0;"| Big 12 Regular Season

|-
!colspan=9 style="background:#960018; color:#FFFDD0;"| Big 12 Women's Tournament

|-
!colspan=9 style="background:#960018; color:#FFFDD0;"| NCAA tournament

x- Sooner Sports Television (SSTV) is aired locally on Fox Sports. However the contract allows games to air on various affiliates. Those affiliates are FSSW, FSSW+, FSOK, FSOK+, and FCS Atlantic, Central, and Pacific.

Rankings
2016–17 NCAA Division I women's basketball rankings

See also
 2016–17 Oklahoma Sooners men's basketball team

References

External links
Official Athletics Site of the Oklahoma Sooners - Women's Basketball

Oklahoma Sooners women's basketball seasons
Oklahoma
Oklahoma
2016 in sports in Oklahoma
2017 in sports in Oklahoma